Otto George Obermaier (born April 16, 1936) was the United States Attorney for the Southern District of New York from September 1989 until February 1993.  He was appointed to this position by George H. W. Bush.

Obermaier was raised in Manhattan.  He graduated from Xavier High School and then received a bachelor's degree in electrical engineering from Manhattan College.  After this Obermaier became an examiner for the United States Patent Office and studied law at the Georgetown University Law Center.  He later served as a law clerk to Judge Richard H. Levet.

During the 1960s Obermaier was an assistant district attorney under Robert M. Morgenthau.  Among the cases Obermaier prosecuted was that of Johnny Dioguardi a member of the Lucchese criminal family.  In 1970 he entered private practice as a defense attorney, primarily in white collar cases.

Obermaier served for a time as a chief trial counsel for the Securities and Exchange Commission.  He was also an associate counsel to the Knapp Commission.

In 2006, he established a law firm with John S. Martin Jr., also a former United States Attorney for the Southern District of New York.

Sources

1936 births
Living people
Manhattan College alumni
Georgetown University Law Center alumni
United States Attorneys for the Southern District of New York